The Rancho Del Paso Stakes was an American Thoroughbred horse race run between 1898 and 1908. Inaugurated at Morris Park Racecourse in Westchester County, New York as a race for two-year-old horse of either sex, it was contested on dirt over a distance of 6 furlongs. When the Morris Park track was closed permanently after the 1904 racing season, the event was picked up by the newly constructed Belmont Park.

Historical notes
The race was named in honor of Rancho Del Paso, the great California breeding farm of James B. A. Haggin. The first edition of the Rancho Del Paso Stakes was held on October 8, 1898 and was won by the Canadian owned colt, Martimas. Earlier in the year, at  New York's Sheepshead Bay Race Track Martimas had won the Futurity Stakes, the  richest and most prestigious race in the country.   However, in a December 22, 1916 retrospective referencing of The Canadian Sportsman magazine, the Daily Racing Form reported that "His greatest performance as a two-year-old was probably in the Rancho Del Paso Stakes in which he ran three-quarters of a mile in the mud the heavy weight up, in 1:12 and a fraction."

The first winner of the Rancho Del Paso Stakes after moving to Belmont Park in 1905 was the filly Brookdale Nymph owned by Harry Payne Whitney. Ridden by Willie Shaw, she won by two and a half lengths while setting a new track record with a time of 1:10 4/5.

What would turn out to be the final running of the Rancho Del Paso Stakes took place on October 12, 1908. Only two horses started in a race offering a purse that had been cut by more than 80 percent from the previous year's offering. Frederick Lewisohn's Etherial won over Newcastle Stable's Wise Mason.

The Demise of the Rancho Del Paso Stakes
The 1908 passage of the Hart-Agnew anti-betting legislation by the New York Legislature under Republican Governor Charles Evans Hughes led to a state-wide shutdown of racing in 1911 and 1912.  A February 21, 1913 ruling by the New York Supreme Court, Appellate Division saw horse racing return in 1913. However, the Rancho Del Paso Stakes was never returned to the stakes schedule.

Records
Speed record:
 1:09.75 @ 6 furlongs: Grenada (1903) & Bedouin (1904)

Most wins by a jockey:
 3 - Willie Shaw (1901, 1904, 1905)

Most wins by a trainer:
 2 - John J. Hyland (1899, 1908)

Most wins by an owner:
 No owner won this race more than once.

Winners

References

Morris Park Racecourse
Belmont Park
Discontinued horse races in New York (state)
Flat horse races for two-year-olds
Recurring sporting events established in 1898
Recurring sporting events disestablished in 1909